Live, Laugh, Love is an inspirational phrase.

Live, Laugh, Love or similar word arrangements may also refer to:

Entities 
 The Live Love Laugh Foundation, an Indian organization that deals with mental health issues

Film 
 Love, Live and Laugh, a 1929 American drama film

Music 
 "Live, Laugh, Love," a pastiche song from Stephen Sondheim's 1971 musical Follies 
 Live, Laugh, Love (album), a 1999 album by Clay Walker
 "Live, Laugh, Love" (song), the title track off of Walker's album
 Live Laugh Love (EP), a 2010 EP by Urma Sellinger

See also
 "...lived well, laughed often, and loved much", an excerpt from the 1904 poem Success by Bessie Anderson Stanley
 Live, Love, Larf & Loaf, a 1987 album by French Frith Kaiser Thompson
Love, Life and Laughter (disambiguation)